The 2020 Major League Rugby season was the third season of Major League Rugby, the professional rugby union competition sanctioned by USA Rugby. The regular season schedule was released on September 23, 2019, and the regular season itself began on February 8, 2020.

Three teams made their debut in 2020: the New England Free Jacks, Old Glory DC, and Rugby ATL. The Seattle Seawolves were the defending champions, having won their second consecutive title in the previous year.

On March 12, 2020, MLR announced the season would go on hiatus immediately for 30 days due to increasing local social distancing restrictions amidst the COVID-19 pandemic.  One week later, MLR announced that the season was officially cancelled.

Teams and format 
With the addition of three teams for the 2020 season, Major League Rugby moved to a two-conference format. For the regular season, each team was to play against the other teams in their conference twice each and against every team in the opposite conference once each for a total of 16 games.

The playoffs expanded from four teams in 2019 to six teams in 2020, with the top three teams from each conference qualifying. The second- and third-placed team from each conference were to play each other in the conference semifinals, with the winner moving on to play the first-placed team in the conference finals. The winners of the conference finals would have the played against each other in the final for the championship.

Regular season

Standings

Matches
The following are the matches for the 2020 Major League Rugby regular season:

Updated to match(es) played on March 8, 2020 
Colors: Blue: home team win; Yellow: draw; Red: away team win.

Scheduled completed

Week 1 (Feb 8–9)

Week 2 (Feb 15–16)

Week 3 (Feb 22–23)

Week 4 (Feb 29 – Mar 1)

Week 5 (Mar 6–8)

Cancelled schedule

Week 6 (Mar 14–15)

Week 7 (Mar 21–22)

Week 8 (Mar 28–29)

Week 9 (Apr 4–5)

Week 10 (Apr 10–12)

Week 11 (Apr 18–19)

Week 12 (Apr 25–26)

Week 13 (May 1–3)

Week 14 (May 9–10)

Week 15 (May 16–17)

Week 16 (May 22–25)

Week 17 (May 30–31)

Playoffs
The top three teams from each conference would have qualified for the playoffs had the season not been cancelled. The top team in each conference earns a bye week while the second and third place team play in a conference semifinal.

Player statistics

Top scorers
The top ten try and point scorers during the 2020 Major League Rugby season were:

Last updated: March 9, 2020

Sanctions

MLR Virtual
Following the cancellation of the 2020 season, the MLR announced they would host a tournament, with each team, playing Rugby 20. The teams would enter a pool to select which nation they would play as. The MLR also announced that all of the MLR teams would be raising Feeding America’s COVID-19 Response Fund. All of the matches would be streamed on the league's Twitch account.

Round 1

Round 2

Round 3

Round 4

Round 5

Playoffs

First round

Semi-finals

Final

Friendlies

MLR Draft

The 1st ever Major League Rugby collegiate draft was held in 2020. Players were eligible for the draft after 3 years of college or if they had reached 21 years of age. Free agents were permitted try out to join teams at 18 years old.

Notes

References

See also
2020 MLR Draft

2020
2020 rugby union tournaments for clubs
2020 in American rugby union
2020 in Canadian rugby union
Sports events curtailed and voided due to the COVID-19 pandemic